Charles Lester Marlatt (1863–1954) was an American entomologist.  Born in 1863 at Atchison, Kansas, he was educated at Kansas State Agricultural College (B.S., 1884; M.S., 1886), where he was assistant professor for two years.  He is the person who introduced the ladybug insect Chilocorus similis into the United States to control the San Jose scale insect, which was first discovered in San Jose, California in 1880 by John Henry Comstock and named by him.  Marlatt worked for the Bureau of Entomology, United States Department of Agriculture.  In 1912 he was appointed chairman of the Federal Horticultural Board.  He was president of the Entomological Society of Washington in 1897–98 and of the American Association of Economic Entomologists in 1899.

His 1907 description of periodic cicadas remains a classic in the field. In this article, Marlatt proposed a grouping of periodic cicadas into 30 different broods, each given a Roman numeral. Broods I–XVII assigned brood numbers for each of 17 sequential calendar years to 17-year cicadas. Broods XVIII–XXX assigned 13 sequential calendar years to 13-year cicadas. Subsequent research has established that, in fact, not every year produces a brood of periodical cicadas. There are only 15 distinct broods, not 30, but Marlatt's scheme continues to be used.

References

Bibliography 
 Marlatt, C. L. (1898). "A consideration of the validity of the old records bearing on the distribution of the broods of the periodical cicada, with particular reference to the occurrence of broods VI and XXIII in 1898." Bulletin of the U.S. Bureau of Entomology. 18: 59-78.
 
 Marlatt, C. L. (1898). "A new nomenclature for the broods of the periodical cicada. Miscellaneous results of work of the Division of Entomology." Bulletin of the USDA Division of Entomology. 18: 52-58.
 Marlatt, C. L. (1902). "A New Nomenclature for the Broods of the Periodical Cicada." USDA, Div. Of Entomology, Circ. No. 45. 8 pp.
 Marlatt, C. L. 1906. "The Periodical Cicada in 1906." USDA, Bureau Of Entomology, Circ. No. 14. 5 pp.
 
 Marlatt, C. L. (1907). "The periodical cicada." U.S.D.A. Bureau Entomology Bulletin. 71: 1-181.
 Marlatt, C. L. (1908). "A successful seventeen-year breeding record for the periodical cicada." Proc. Entomol. Soc. Wash. 9: 16-18.
 Marlatt, C. L. (1919). "The '17-year locust' in 1919." U.S.D.A. Circular 127: 1-10.
 Marlatt, C. L. (1923). The periodical cicada. U.S.D.A. Bureau Entomology Bulletin 71: 1-183.
 More, Thomas, Singing Insects of North America, University of Florida map
 Post, Susan L. The Trill of a Life Time, photographs by Michael R. Jeffords, The Illinois Steward, Spring 2004. 
 Stannard, Jr., Lewis. The Distribution of Periodical Cicadas in Illinois, 1975.

External links
 

1863 births
1954 deaths
American entomologists
People from Atchison, Kansas
Kansas State University alumni